The Chamber of Deputies of the Portuguese Republic (Portuguese: Câmara dos Deputados da República Portuguesa), alternatively translatable as the House of Representatives, was the lower house of the Congress of the Republic, the legislature of the First Portuguese Republic. The Chamber of Deputies was elected for a three-year term and had the power to lay taxes, initiate constitutional amendments and legislation regarding the Armed Forces, debate on bills proposed by the Executive, and decide on the extension of the legislative term.

History

References 

Defunct lower houses
Government of Portugal
First Portuguese Republic